The Diocese of Brechin is in the east of Scotland, and is the smallest of the seven dioceses of the Scottish Episcopal Church. It covers the historic counties of Angus and Kincardineshire. It stretches from Muchalls in the north east down to Dundee in the south, and across to Glencarse in the south west. The cathedral and administrative centre is St Paul’s Cathedral in Dundee. The diocese continues to be named after its medieval centre of Brechin.

The diocese is thought to have been founded in 1153 by Bishop Samson. The diocese had a continuous line of bishops leading through the Reformation, when Donald Campbell (1557) and John Sinclair (1565) were elected Bishops of Brechin, but not consecrated; the line was continued later through Andrew Lamb. In 1566, Alexander Campbell was appointed as titular bishop. The line continued in proper form among Episcopalians with Andrew Lamb in 1610. From 1695 until 1709, the diocese was united with the Diocese of Edinburgh, with the latter's bishop, Alexander Rose, being also Bishop of Brechin. The line of independent bishops of Brechin restarted with John Falconar in 1709, and has continued to the present day. Following the resignation and death of the Right Reverend Dr John Mantle, in 2010, Dr Nigel Peyton was appointed Bishop of Brechin in May 2011. Dr Peyton was chosen ahead of four other candidates including Dr Alison Peden.

The Diocese of Brechin is twinned with the Episcopal Diocese of Iowa (Iowa, United States) and with the Anglican Diocese of Swaziland (Swaziland).

The manuscript records of the Diocese of Brechin are held by University of Dundee Archive Services. The archive collections include the administrative records of the diocese, records of individual churches, and the correspondence of Alexander Penrose Forbes and George Frederick Boyle.

Area and population 
The diocese covers the historic counties of Kincardineshire (except the Banchory and Lower Deeside areas) (population 31,000), Angus (except the Forfar and Kirriemuir areas) (population 233,500), and the Glencarse area of Perthshire (population 9,000).

This total population of approximately 273,500 gives the diocese a ratio of one priest to every 19,500 inhabitants and one church to every 10,900 inhabitants.

List of churches 
The diocese has 12 stipendiary clergy and 25 active churches.

Closed churches in the diocese

References

 
Brechin
Christianity in Dundee
Christianity in Angus, Scotland
1709 establishments in Scotland